USS Choctaw was a large (1,004-ton) steamer built for the merchant service, but acquired by the Union Navy during the second year of the American Civil War.

Choctaw, with her crew of 106, was outfitted by the Navy as a ram with heavy rifled guns and was used both as a gunboat and as a ram on the rivers of the Confederate States of America.

Service history 

Choctaw, a sidewheel steamer, was the first ship of the United States Navy to be named for the Choctaw Indian tribe, formerly of Alabama and Mississippi, now resident in Oklahoma. She was built for the merchant service; her keel was laid down at New Albany, Indiana, in 1853.  She was launched in 1856. She was purchased by the United States Army on 27 September 1862 and converted into an ironclad ram by Edward Hartt, then transferred to commissioned into the United States Navy at St. Louis, Missouri on 23 March 1863 with Lieutenant Commander Francis M. Ramsay in command.

From 23 April 1863, until the end of the war,  Choctaw  operated in the Mississippi River and its tributaries. Between 29 April and 1 May 1863, she stood up the Yazoo River for a feigned attack on Haynes' Bluff, Mississippi, designed to prevent the Confederates from reinforcing Grand Gulf. During this action, she was struck 53 times. Remaining in the Yazoo, she took part in attacks with the Union Army which led to the destruction of Confederate works at Haynes' Bluff and the burning of the navy yard and ships lying there, at Yazoo City, between 18 and 23 May.

On 6 and 7 June, she helped to repel a Confederate attack at Milliken's Bend, Louisiana, after which she rescued a large number of Confederates from the river and sent them in as prisoners. Between 7 March and 15 May 1864, she took part in the operations leading to the capture of Fort DeRussy. Choctaw  arrived at Algiers, Louisiana, on 20 July 1865, and was decommissioned on 22 July 1865. She was sold at New Orleans, Louisiana on 28 March 1866.

References

Ships of the Union Navy
Ships built in New Albany, Indiana
Steamships of the United States Navy
Rams of the United States Navy
Gunboats of the United States Navy
American Civil War patrol vessels of the United States
1856 ships
Maritime incidents in 1863